Andrew James Luckman (born 1972) is a British retired sport shooter.

Sport shooting career
In 1995, he won the Queen's Prize at the NRA Imperial Meeting at Bisley Camp.

He represented England and won a bronze medal in the fullbore rifle Queens Prize, at the 1998 Commonwealth Games in Kuala Lumpur, Malaysia.

Personal life
He is the older brother of the four times Commonwealth Games gold medallist David Luckman.

References

1972 births
Living people
British male sport shooters
Commonwealth Games medallists in shooting
Commonwealth Games bronze medallists for England
Shooters at the 1998 Commonwealth Games
20th-century British people
Medallists at the 1998 Commonwealth Games